SEM9 is a professional esports organisation based in Kuala Lumpur, Malaysia. It has teams competing in PUBG Mobile, Call of Duty: Mobile, League of Legends, and League of Legends: Wild Rift. It also operates SEM9 Senai, an esports-themed hotel located in Senai, Johor, Malaysia.

SEM9 acquired rival Malaysian esports organisation Berjaya Dragons on 16 November 2021. As part of the acquisition, SEM9 was given Berjaya Dragons' spot in the Pacific Championship Series (PCS), the top-level league for the game in Taiwan, Hong Kong, Macau, and Southeast Asia. The two organisations' League of Legends: Wild Rift rosters were also merged.

Call of Duty: Mobile 
SEM9 finished third at the COD Mobile Championship 2021: Garena qualifier.

PUBG Mobile 
SEM9's PUBG Mobile team is known as SEM9.GANK. Its current roster consists of ManParang (in-game leader), Draxx (sniper), Bravo (fragger), Putra (rusher) and the youngest member Dep (rusher).

League of Legends

History 
SEM9 acquired Berjaya Dragons' spot in the Pacific Championship Series (PCS) on 16 November 2021. SEM9's inaugural roster was the first all-Malaysian team to compete in the PCS.

SEM9 finished last (tenth) in the 2022 PCS Spring regular season with a 0–18 record, becoming the first team in PCS history to end a split winless.

Final roster

League of Legends: Wild Rift

Current roster

Other ventures 
SEM9 operates SEM9 Senai, an esports-themed hotel located near Senai International Airport, in Senai, Johor, Malaysia. It is Southeast Asia's first esports-themed hotel.

On 16 March 2022, SEM9 introduced 99LIVES, a collection of cat-themed non-fungible tokens.

References

External links 
 

2020 establishments in Malaysia
Esports teams established in 2020
Esports teams based in Malaysia
Pacific Championship Series teams